Grecia Forest Reserve, is a protected area in Costa Rica, managed under the Central Conservation Area, it was created in 1974 by law 5463.

References 

Nature reserves in Costa Rica
Protected areas established in 1974